Team Sugar is a South African political party chiefly present in northern KwaZulu-Natal. It broke away from the Economic Freedom Fighters and was initially active as a labour and social movement focusing on factory worker rights.

The party forms part of the governing coalition in Newcastle, with leader Musa Thwala as deputy mayor.

Election results
The party first contested the 2021 municipal elections, winning seven seats in the Newcastle Local Municipality, three seats in the Amajuba District Municipality and one in the Dannhauser Local Municipality.

The party retained a ward seat in a Newcastle by-election after its coalition partner, the Inkatha Freedom Party, agreed to support its candidate.

Municipal elections

|-
! Election
! Votes
! %
|-
! 2021
| 27,722
| 0.09%
|-
|}

References

Political parties in South Africa